Vinie Burrows ( Harrison; born November 15, 1924) is an American stage actress on Broadway.

Life and career 
Burrows was born on November 15, 1924. She graduated from Harlem High School at the age of 15, having already begun her career as a child actress on radio and on stage when she appeared the Broadway play The Wisteria Trees. She later chose to create her own plays and one-woman shows because she felt that the roles available for black women were those of a “Mammie” or “lady of the evening.” Many of her productions were seen on Broadway and in over 6,000 theaters and other venues across four continents. She appeared in a show titled Sister! Sister! at the University of Delaware in Newark in November 1991. She appeared in a reprise of the show titled Sister! Sister! at Brandeis University's Women's Studies Research Center in March 2001. In 2003, she played the role of Barbara Scarlatti in Bel Canto on stage in Atlanta, Georgia. At the University of Iowa in March 2007 she appeared in a show titled Black on the Great White Way: The Story of Rose McClendon.

She was to be a panelist in the 2000–2001 African Diaspora lecture series at the Center for Ideas and Society in Riverside, California. The Black Theater Guild at Massachusetts Institute of Technology hosted Burrows for lunch in February 2003.'

In 2020 Burrows was given an Obie Award for Lifetime Achievement.

Activism 
Burows has been active at the United Nations Economic and Social Council on the issues of the status of women and Southern Africa. In 1980, she became an associate of the Women's Institute for Freedom of the Press (WIFP). WIFP is an American nonprofit publishing organization. The organization works to increase communication between women and connect the public with forms of women-based media.

Awards 
Burrows won the Paul Robeson Award in 1986. In 2014, Burrows received an award from the International Communications Association and AUDELCO for her Outstanding Contribution to the Arts and the Community.

In 2018, Burrows was named the honoree at Theater for the New City's 15th annual Love N' Courage gala, where she was awarded a Lifetime Achievement Award.

In 2020 Burrows was given an Obie Award for Lifetime Achievement.

References

External links 
 VINIE BURROWS Website
 Boston Social Forum, July 2004
 "Vinie Burrows – Actor, Storyteller, Activist" @ Hostos, CUNY.

1924 births
Living people
20th-century African-American people
20th-century African-American women
21st-century African-American people
21st-century African-American women
African-American actresses
American stage actresses